Aimee Pratt (born 3 October 1997) is a British athlete. She competed in the women's 3000 metres steeplechase event at the 2019 World Athletics Championships.

In 2016, she competed in the women's 3000 metres steeplechase event at the 2016 IAAF World U20 Championships held in Bydgoszcz, Poland. She became the British champion when she won the 3000 metres steeplechase event at the 2020 British Athletics Championships in a time of 9 minutes 30.73 seconds.

References

External links
 
 
 
 
 

1997 births
Living people
Place of birth missing (living people)
British female middle-distance runners
British female steeplechase runners
English female middle-distance runners
English female steeplechase runners
World Athletics Championships athletes for Great Britain
British Athletics Championships winners
Athletes (track and field) at the 2020 Summer Olympics
Olympic athletes of Great Britain